Transforming Faces (TF) is a Canadian-based charity that provides comprehensive cleft care for children born with cleft lip and palate and their families. TF partners with local medical teams to ensure that life-changing cleft care is accessible for all. 

Cleft lip and palate are one of the most common birth anomalies in the world, affecting roughly 1 in 700 children. A cleft occurs when the tissue of a baby's lip or the roof of their mouth do not form properly during pregnancy, causing an opening in the lip, palate or both. While the type and severity of the cleft will vary from child to child, the condition typically affects more than just a child's appearance, also affecting their speech, hearing, nutrition, and ability to develop socially.

History 

Transforming Faces was founded in 1999 to improve the quality of long-term cleft care in developing countries by working alongside local organizations. Jackie Elton, a UK-based businesswoman, and Jo Jamieson, a Canadian international development worker, found the organization in Toronto, Ontario.

Approach 

Transforming Faces' comprehensive approach to cleft care not only physically transforms faces, but also improves a child's life by allowing them to finish school, develop healthy relationships, start families, and participate in society without the constant threat of discrimination and exclusion.

While surgical repair is important, it is just the beginning of a child's journey to full rehabilitation from their cleft. In reality, cleft patients require years of treatments - including speech therapy, dental and orthodontic care, hearing assessments, and psycho-social support - which are rarely accessible or affordable in the contexts where TF works. Many children born with a cleft will require up to 20 years or rehabilitative treatment.

Areas of operation 

Transforming Faces partners with local medical teams in: Argentina, Costa Rica, Chile, Ethiopia, India, Myanmar, Peru, Thailand, and Uganda.

Financial information 

Transforming Faces is a registered Canadian charity with the Canada Revenue Agency.

A private charitable foundation covers all of TF's non-program costs, allowing Transforming Faces to direct 100% of every dollar donated towards comprehensive cleft care programs.

References 

Organizations based in Toronto
Health charities in Canada
Oral and maxillofacial surgery organizations